Turkmenka is a rural locality (a selo) in Lineyninsky Selsoviet, Narimanovsky District, Astrakhan Oblast, Russia. The population was 417 as of 2010. There are 3 streets.

Geography 
Turkmenka is located 86 km southwest of Narimanov (the district's administrative centre) by road. Lineynaya is the nearest rural locality.

References 

Rural localities in Narimanovsky District